WPAR (91.3 MHz) is a non-commercial FM radio station licensed to Salem, Virginia and serving the Roanoke - Lynchburg metropolitan area.  It is the flagship of "Spirit FM," a group of Christian Adult Contemporary stations owned by Positive Alternative Radio, which is headquartered in Blacksburg.  The stations are listener-supported and hold periodic fundraisers on the air.  WPAR has studios and offices on Timberlake Road in Lynchburg.

Positive Alternative Radio operates a network of full-power stations and FM translators, stretching from North Carolina and West Virginia through the Shenandoah Valley, to the fringes of the Richmond metropolitan area.  WPAR has an effective radiated power (ERP) of 3,300 watts.  Its transmitter is on Tinker Top Road in Hollins, Virginia.  WRXT 90.3 FM, a rebroadcaster of WPAR, uses HD technology for its transmissions.

Simulcasts

Translators

References

External links
 Spirit FM Online
 

PAR
Radio stations established in 1993
1993 establishments in Virginia
Contemporary Christian radio stations in the United States
HD Radio stations